Young Progressives (MP) is a social liberal youth organization in Slovakia connected to the political party Progressive Slovakia.

History 

Young Progressives was founded in 2018. Since March 2019, organization is associate member of the European Liberal Youth.

References

External links 
  

Youth wings of political parties in Slovakia
Youth wings of liberal parties